Ninaithen Vandhai is a 1998 Indian Tamil-language romantic drama film directed by K. Selva Bharathy and produced by Allu Aravind. The film stars Vijay, Rambha and Devayani, with Charle, Ranjith, Senthil, and Vinu Chakravarthy in supporting roles. It is a remake of the 1996 Telugu film Pelli Sandadi. The music was composed by Deva. It released on 10 April 1998 to positive reviews and became a commercial success.

Plot
Gokula Krishnan is a music loving man who begins the film with a dream where he sees his dream girl. The only trademark he remembers from it is a mole which is situated next to her navel (bellybutton). He then becomes determined in looking for his "dream girl" with the help of his uncle and brothers-in-law. On the other hand, his father arranges his marriage to a village girl named Savithri, which Gokul (often referred to as "Mapillai") objects to, but Savithri loves him. Gokul later sees his dream girl, Swapna, at a wedding where he spots the mole on her navel. He then sings to her, impressing her, but she leaves abruptly. He later sees her at a music class which he teaches, and from then on, they love each other. Gokul tries to stop the marriage with Savithri in many failed attempts due to everyone in Savithri's family getting the wrong impression. Swapna then arrives to Savithri's village, and it is revealed that they are sisters. Neither of them knew that they love the same man.

Gokul tells Savithri's father that he does not want the marriage, which Swapna overhears. Knowing how much her sister loves him, Swapna is determined to get Gokul to forget her by faking that she has a blood clot in her heart. After much persuasion, Gokul agrees to marry Savithri. Throughout the film, another man, Vignesh, is in love with Swapna and tries to get her to marry him and if not, he will kill her with him also. When Vignesh reveals after almost killing Savithri that he loved Swapna but said that she will only love and marry Gokul, Savithri lets Swapna marry him.

Cast

Production
The film was a remake of the successful Telugu film Pelli Sandadi (1996). The film marked the debut of Sundar C's erstwhile dialogue writer K. Selvabharathy. Actor and comedian Goundamani was initially expected to portray a key role, but eventually did not feature.

Release
Ninaithen Vandhai released on 10 April 1998. The film received positive reviews and became a commercial success. It became Vijay's 5th consecutive successful film after his 1997 films Love Today, Once More, Nerrukku Ner and Kadhalukku Mariyadhai.

Reception
Jeyachandran from Indolink.com gave the film 3.5 out of 5, citing that "the story is nothing new, the treatment of the story is commendable, backed by good music, songs and comedy, make this film an entertainer" and that "the director has tried hard to make a feel good romantic flick and has partially succeeded". Ananda Vikatan gave the film a score of 35 out of 100.

The success of the film prompted film-makers to sign on Rambha to appear alongside Vijay in a couple of his next projects - Endrendrum Kadhal (1999) and Minsara Kanna (1999).

Soundtrack 

The film score and the soundtrack were composed by Deva was well received by the audience. It consists of 7 songs. Three of the tunes were borrowed from the original Telugu film (Unnai Ninaithu, Pottu Vaithu & Un Marbile Vizhi). The song "Vannanilavae Vannanilavae" based on Raga Madhukauns and songs "Maligayae Maligaiyae", "Unai Ninaithu Naan Enai" and "Un Marbile Vizhi Moodi" based on ragam Hindolam and song "Ennavale Ennavale" based on ragam Shuddha Dhanyasi and song "Pottu Vaithu Poomudikkum" based on ragam Hamsanandi.

References

External links
 

1998 films
Tamil remakes of Telugu films
Films scored by Deva (composer)
1990s Tamil-language films
Indian romantic musical films
Indian romantic drama films
Geetha Arts films
1998 directorial debut films
Films directed by K. Selva Bharathy
1998 romantic drama films
1990s romantic musical films